The 2013 Blossom Cup was a professional tennis tournament played on outdoor hard courts. It was the fourth edition of the tournament which was part of the 2013 ITF Women's Circuit, offering a total of $50,000 in prize money. It took place in Quanzhou, China, on 7–13 January 2013.

Singles main draw entrants

Seeds 

 1 Rankings as of 31 December 2012

Other entrants 
The following players received wildcards into the singles main draw:
  Lu Jingjing
  Tian Ran
  Yang Yi
  Yang Zhaoxuan

The following players received entry from the qualifying draw:
  Liu Fangzhou
  Miki Miyamura
  Tang Haochen
  Wang Yafan

Champions

Singles 

  Varatchaya Wongteanchai def.  Nadiya Kichenok 6–2, 6–7(5–7), 7–6(7–5)

Doubles 

  Irina Buryachok /  Nadiya Kichenok def.  Liang Chen /  Sun Shengnan 3–6, 6–3, [12–10]

External links 
 2013 Blossom Cup at ITFtennis.com

2013 ITF Women's Circuit
2013
2013 in Chinese tennis